Hippolyte Louis Gory (27 September 1800 – 26 April 1852) was a French entomologist.

Life
Hippolyte Louis Gory was born in Paris, 5th arrondissement the 27 (or the 28) September 1800 (the exact date is 5 vendémiaire an IX in the republican calendar). He was married to Sophie Marie Sotom at Paris 30 March 1826. He died 26 April 1852 at Paris, 11ème arrondissement.

Works
Horn & Schenkling give a list of 63 entomological works

One of his main works was the Histoire naturelle et iconographie des insectes coléoptères (1837–1841), volumes 2-4;  Castelnau writing the first volume only. This has become one of the rarest entomological books.

Another well-known magistral work is the Monographie des Cétoines et genres voisins, published with Achille Rémy Percheron.

References and external links

Gordh, G. (2001). A Dictionary of Entomology. Wallingford, United Kingdom: CABI publishing.

External links
 

French entomologists
1800 births
1852 deaths
Coleopterists